The  is a corporate museum operated by Panasonic in Kadoma, Osaka. The museum was temporarily closed in October 2017 and reopened in March 2018.

Overview
The Matsushita Electric History Museum is a corporate museum opened in March 1968 by Matsushita Electric Industrial Co. (currently Panasonic) as one of the projects to commemorate its 50th founding anniversary. There are approximately 600 exhibits. The museum building is a renovated company headquarters constructed in 1933. On March 7, 1995, the museum's interior was fully renovated to commemorate the 100th anniversary of Konosuke Matsushita's birth.

The museum exhibits Konosuke Matsushita's life and the history of Panasonic up to the present. The section featuring advertisements and other materials spanning from the company's founding to the 1980s has been particularly well received by visitors. The museum's high-definition theater shows the film footage of Konosuke Matsushita.

Since 2001, the  has been held annually from late April through June. This special exhibition is based on the concept of deriving solutions to contemporary business challenges from the universal truths articulated through Konosuke Matsushita's words and actions. Guide brochures are available in Japanese, English, and Chinese, and visual materials on display are also available in Japanese, English, and partially in Chinese. Translations in more languages, such as Spanish and Russian, are being planned.

See also
Kōnosuke Matsushita
Panasonic

References

External links
 Panasonic museum

Wikipedia Student Program
Museums established in 1968
Museums in Osaka Prefecture
Kadoma, Osaka
Panasonic
1968 establishments in Japan
Biographical museums in Japan